Reggie Witherspoon may refer to:

 Reggie Witherspoon (basketball) (born 1961), American basketball coach
 Reggie Witherspoon (sprinter) (born 1985), American sprinter